Napoleon Murphy Brock (born June 7, 1945) is an American singer, saxophonist and flute player who is best known for his work with Frank Zappa in the 1970s, including the albums Apostrophe ('), Roxy & Elsewhere, One Size Fits All, and Bongo Fury. He contributed notable vocal performances to the Zappa songs "Village of the Sun," "Cheepnis," and "Florentine Pogen."

Career
 
Brock's musical career began in the San Francisco South Bay Area in the late 1960s with a seven and eight piece band he had organized named "Communication Plus".  He was the lead singer, songwriter, and arranger of the band's strongly R&B-influenced rock performances. He also played the saxophone and flute.  He played in a variety of local clubs including The Brass Rail, The Mecca, and Gary R. Schmidt's, The Odyssey Room. He was discovered playing for a dance band in Hawaii in the early 1970s by Zappa's road manager. The participation of George Duke and Jean-Luc Ponty convinced Brock to join the band as lead singer.

Brock's numerous performances with Zappa include the role of the "Evil Prince" on the Thing-Fish album. He remains a regular performer at Zappanale.

Brock appeared in the 2005 film Rock School, a documentary about The Paul Green School of Rock Music, an extracurricular music program that he and Project/Object have closely supported for several years.

In 2006, he toured with Frank Zappa's son Dweezil on the latter's Zappa Plays Zappa shows. He also regularly tours with fellow Zappa alumnus Ike Willis and others with Andre Cholmondeley's Project/Object.  Other Zappa related projects in which he has been involved include the Tampa, Florida based band Bogus Pomp, and the 16 piece Ed Palermo Big Band from New York City.

He is most frequently seen fronting The Grand Mothers Of Invention with Roy Estrada, Tom Fowler and Don Preston (the only Frank Zappa alumni from The Mothers of Invention regularly performing the music of Frank Zappa), performing over 91 times since 2002.

His own most recent release is the 2003 album Balls.

Brock is mentioned in the 2007 memoir My Lobotomy by Howard Dully and Charles Fleming, which describes Dully's experiences before and after undergoing an icepick transorbital lobotomy in 1960, at 12 years of age. Brock, while studying psychology and music at San Jose State University, was employed in the mid-1960s as a counselor at Rancho Linda, a "residential center for special education" where Dully lived after having the procedure and being released from juvenile hall and a mental asylum. Dully had fond memories of Brock, and described him as "cool" and having "played all kinds of instruments."

Grammy Award
At the 51st Grammy Awards on February 8, 2009, Napoleon won a Grammy for his performance of the song "Peaches en Regalia" with the band Zappa Plays Zappa, which also featured Steve Vai and Dweezil Zappa. The song originally appeared on Frank Zappa's 1969 Hot Rats LP.

Film

Brock has appeared in several Zappa documentaries and movies.  They include:
Baby Snakes (background)
The Dub Room Special
A Token of His Extreme
The Amazing Mr. Bickford (on a television screen in the background)
The True Story of Frank Zappa's 200 Motels (background)
Roxy the Movie [DVD, 2015]

Discography

Solo albums

Appearances on Zappa albums

Appearances on George Duke albums

References

External links

Official Napoleon Murphy Brock website

Panel Discussion: Brown Shoes Don’t Make It – The Music of Frank Zappa with Bill Milkowski, Michael G. Nastos, Napoleon Murphy Brock, Ed Palermo, Ralphe Armstrong.

1945 births
Living people
Place of birth missing (living people)
African-American woodwind musicians
African-American male singers
American rock saxophonists
American male saxophonists
American multi-instrumentalists
Grammy Award winners
The Mothers of Invention members
21st-century saxophonists
Zappa Plays Zappa members